Kirill Alekseyevich Kostin (born 25 March 1994) is a Russian former football player.

Club career
He made his professional debut in the Russian Professional Football League for FC Zenit-2 St. Petersburg on 15 July 2013 in a game against FC Tosno. He made his Russian Football National League debut for Zenit-2 on 31 July 2016 in a game against FC Dynamo Moscow.

References

External links

1994 births
Footballers from Saint Petersburg
Living people
Russian footballers
Russia youth international footballers
Russia under-21 international footballers
Association football defenders
Russian expatriate footballers
Expatriate footballers in Portugal
U.D. Leiria players
FC Dynamo Saint Petersburg players
FC Zenit-2 Saint Petersburg players